Mahendra Mountains is a mountain range described in the epics Ramayana and Mahabharata. It is identified to be the part of the mountain ranges in the east coast of India (Eastern Ghats), that falls in Odisha & Andhra Pradesh. It is the place where Bhargava Rama or Parashurama spending his days of life, as he is one of the chiranjeevi or having life up to pralaya. This place was visited by Arjuna as part of his pilgrimage.

It is said that lord parshurama penance here and will do so till the end of kaliyug .

Mahendragiri

The puranic mountain Mahendragiri is situated in Paralakhemundi, Gajapati district. Legend says that it is the place where Lord Parashurama stays and does tapasya. Temples built by Pandavas are seen. The main festival here is Shivaratri, the worship of Shiva, the guru or percepter of Lord Parashurama.

References

External links

Ancient Indian mountains
Mountains in Buddhism